Konaka-ike is an earthfill dam located in Chiba Prefecture in Japan. The dam is used for irrigation. The catchment area of the dam is 2.8 km2. The dam impounds about 11  ha of land when full and can store 1025 thousand cubic meters of water. The construction of the dam was completed in 1947.

References

Dams in Chiba Prefecture
1947 establishments in Japan